Edward Francis Bressoud (born May 2, 1932) is a former shortstop in Major League Baseball who played from  through  for the New York / San Francisco Giants (1956–1961), Boston Red Sox (1962–1965), New York Mets (1966) and St. Louis Cardinals (1967).

Early life
Bressoud was born in Los Angeles, the fourth of seven children of Charles Bressoud, a native of Lima who had French ancestry.  He graduated from George Washington High School then attended San Jose State University and the University of California, Los Angeles. He began his pro career in 1950 and missed two minor league seasons in military service during the Korean War.

MLB career
In 1956, Bill Rigney became the manager of the Giants. Bressoud had played shortstop for Rigney at Minneapolis in 1956, and Alvin Dark, the regular Giants' shortstop, had been injured in August 1955. During spring training, Rigney made plans to move Dark to third base and make Bressoud the starting shortstop. However, Bressoud started slowly and was sent back to Minneapolis at the beginning of the year. Dark was traded to the St. Louis Cardinals on June 14, and Bressoud was immediately recalled to take his place.

Bressoud spent two years with the MLB club in New York City, then four years after its 1958 transfer to San Francisco. Bressoud was the first selection of the Houston Colt .45s in the 1961 expansion draft, then was traded to the Red Sox in exchange for their regular shortstop, Don Buddin.

Bressoud played four seasons for Boston, hitting 40 doubles, nine triples, 14 home runs, 79 runs and a career-high 68 RBI in 1962, and 59 extra-bases in 1963, including a career-high 20 home runs and four two-HR games. In  he posted career-numbers in batting average (.293), hits (166), runs (86) and doubles (41), and represented the Red Sox in the All-Star Game. 

After that, he played for the New York Mets. He was acquired along with Danny Napoleon and cash by the Cardinals from the Mets for Jerry Buchek, Art Mahaffey and Tony Martínez on April 1, 1967. He ended his major league career with the  world champion Cardinals. In the 1967 World Series — against Bressoud's former team, the Red Sox — he appeared in Games 2 and 5 as a late-inning replacement for light-hitting Cardinal shortstop Dal Maxvill, but did not record a plate appearance.

In a 12-season career, Bressoud was a .252 hitter with 925 hits, 94 home runs, and 365 RBI in 1,186 games.

Later life
Following his playing retirement he managed in the minor leagues and scouted for the California Angels. He was a faculty member and coach at De Anza College for more than 20 years. As of 2017, he and his wife Carol had been married for 58 years. They had two sons and two daughters.

References

External links

Retrosheet
Top Performances

1932 births
Living people
American League All-Stars
Baseball players from Los Angeles
Boston Red Sox players
California Angels scouts
Major League Baseball shortstops
Minneapolis Millers (baseball) players
New York Giants (NL) players
New York Mets players
St. Louis Cardinals players
San Francisco Giants players
Sioux City Soos players
Springfield Giants (Ohio) players